Rajakokila/Rajkokila was an Indian actress. She was a prominent lead actress during the 1970s in Malayalam, Tamil, Kannada, and Telugu films. She was well noted for her glamorous roles. She is married to Crossbelt Mani. The actress Meena is her niece.

Partial filmography

Malayalam
 Pakalkkinavu (1966)... Shari
 Kodungallooramma (1968)
 Yakshi (1968)... Chandran's wife
 Panchavadi (1973)
 Thekkankaattu (1973)
 Nadeenadanmaare Aavasyamundu (1974)
 Thumbolaarcha (1974)
 Durga (1974)
 Velicham Akale (1975)
 Pennpada (1975)
 Kuttichaathan (1975)
 Paalazhi Madhanam (1975)
 Dharmakshethre Kurukshethre (1975)
 Kalyaanappanthal (1975)
 Sooryavamsham (1975)
 Thaamarathoni (1975)
 Chottaanikkara Amma (1976)
 Yudhabhoomi (1976)
 Kuttavum Shikshayum (1976)
 Penpuli (1977)
 Anjali (1977)
 Jagadguru Aadisankaran (1977)
 Pallavi (1977)
 Ee Manoharatheeram (1978)

Tamil
 Motor Sundaram Pillai (1966)
 Chakkaram  (1968)
 Thedi Vandha Mappillai (1970)... Radha
 Oru Thai Makkal (1971)
 Ganga (1972) 
 Agathiyar (1972)
 Manipayal (1973)... Rossie
 Dhaagam (1974)  
 Enga Pattan Sothu (1975) 
 Ore Thandhai (1976)
 Ninaipadhu Niraiverum (1976)

References

External links

 Rajakokila at MSI

Actresses in Malayalam cinema
Indian film actresses
Actresses in Tamil cinema
Actresses from Kerala
Year of birth missing (living people)
Living people
Actresses in Kannada cinema
Actresses in Telugu cinema
21st-century Indian actresses